Jebel Khalid is an archaeological site in modern Syria. Australian excavations starting in 1986 discovered the remains of a Hellenistic, Seleucid town perhaps founded by Seleucus I Nicator. The town flourished till around 70 BC and was then abandoned. The ancient name is not yet known for sure. Due to the political situation in Syria the excavations stopped in 2010.

The city stretches along the Euphrates and is surrounded by a wall, about 3.4 km long. Within the city wall are the remains of a governor's palace, a temple of the Amphiprostyle type  and palaestra. One insula was completely excavated. A second insula was partly uncovered. Outside the town wall were found the cemeteries of the inhabitants.

Excavation reports 
G.W. Clarke: Jebel Khalid on the Euphrates: Report on Excavations 1986–1996, Eisenbrauns 2002, 
Heather Jackson: Jebel Khalid on the Euphrates. Volume 2, The terracotta figurines, Sydney: MEDITARCH, 2002, 
Heather Jackson: Jebel Khalid on the Euphrates, Volume 3: The Pottery, Sydney: MEDITARCH, 2011,  
Heather Jackson: Jebel Khalid on the Euphrates, Volume 4, The housing insula, Sydney: MEDITARCH, 2014, 
G. Clarke, H. Jackson, C. E. V. Nixon, J. Tidmarsh, K. Wesselingh and L. Cougle-Jose: Jebel Khalid on the Euphrates, Volume 5: Report on Excavations 2000–2010. Mediterranean Archaeology supplement, 10. Sydney: MEDITARCH Publications; Sydney University Press, 2016,

References 

Ancient cities of the Middle East
Populated places established in the 3rd century BC
Hellenistic sites
Hellenistic sites in Syria

External links 

The Jebel Khalid archives maintained at the University of Melbourne